Utah is  a state in the United States.

Utah may also refer to:
Utah (film), a 1945 film
Utah, Illinois, an unincorporated community
Utah, Indiana, a community in Indiana, United States
Utah, New South Wales, a parish in Australia
USS Utah (BB-31), an American battleship
Utah County, Utah
University of Utah, a public university in Utah
Utah Utes, the above school's athletic program
Juttah, biblical town
Utah teapot

People with the name
Utah Phillips (1935–2008), American labor activist and singer

See also
Utah Beach, code name for landing beach in Operation Overlord
Utah Lake
Utah State University
Utah War, conflict between Mormons and United States
Utah v. Evans, 2002 U.S. Supreme Court case on the use of statistical techniques in the census